Janik Mäder (born 27 September 1996) is a German professional footballer who plays as a midfielder for Chemie Leipzig.

Club career
On 27 July 2020, Mäder joined FC Energie Cottbus.

References

External links
 
 
 

1996 births
Living people
People from Borna
Footballers from Saxony
German footballers
Association football midfielders
RB Leipzig II players
ZFC Meuselwitz players
FSV Zwickau players
FC Energie Cottbus players
BSG Chemie Leipzig (1997) players
3. Liga players
Regionalliga players